Thonnance-les-Moulins is a commune in the Haute-Marne department in north-eastern France. The current mayor is Lionel Français, re-elected in 2020. The town hall is located at 34 Grand'rue, 52230 Thonnance-les-Moulins.

Population 
As of 2019, the resident population of Thonnance-les-Moulins was 116.

Key landmark 
The Château de Brouthières was built in the 18th century. Part of the structure (façades and roofs of the château, and the dovecote) is listed as an historical monument.

See also
Communes of the Haute-Marne department

References

Thonnancelesmoulins